Jim Misener (born July 1, 1956 in Roblin, Manitoba) is a Canadian former ice hockey winger who became  the MJHL career leader in points, assists, and goals by the end of the 1976–77 MJHL season.

Awards and achievements
MJHL Scoring Champion (1975)
MJHL Goal Scoring Leader (1975)
MJHL First All-Star Team (1977)
MJHL Most Valuable Player (1977)

References
Manitoba Junior Hockey League
Winnipeg Free Press Archives

1956 births
Living people
Canadian ice hockey forwards
Hampton Aces players
Ice hockey people from Manitoba
Dauphin Kings players
People from Roblin, Manitoba